is a type of Japanese pan-fried batter, popular in the Kantō region, similar to okonomiyaki, but using different liquid ingredients.

Ingredients
The ingredients in monjayaki are finely chopped and mixed into the batter before frying. Monjayaki batter has ingredients similar to okonomiyaki. However, additional dashi or water is added to the monjayaki batter mixture, making it runnier than okonomiyaki. The consistency of cooked monjayaki is comparable to melted cheese.

Diners eat directly from the grill using a small spatula. Monjayaki diners also participate in the cooking by spreading raw monja on the grill so that crispy bits form and caramelize. Many monjayaki restaurants can be found in the Tsukishima district of Tokyo where the dish is said to have originated. Most of these restaurants also serve regular okonomiyaki.

See also
 Japanese cuisine
 Teppanyaki
 Okonomiyaki

References

Japanese cuisine